"One O'Clock Jump" is a jazz standard, a 12-bar blues instrumental, written by Count Basie in 1937.

Background
The melody derived from band members' riffs—Basie rarely wrote down musical ideas, so Eddie Durham and Buster Smith helped him crystallize his ideas. The original 1937 recording of the tune by Basie and his band is noted for the saxophone work of Herschel Evans and Lester Young, trumpet by Buck Clayton, Walter Page on bass, and Basie himself on piano.
The song is typical of Basie's early riff style.  
The instrumentation is based on "head arrangements" where each section makes up their part based on what the other sections are playing.
Individuals take turns improvising over the top of the entire sound. Basie recorded "One O'Clock Jump" several times after the original performance for Decca in 1937, for Columbia in 1942 and 1950 and on a number of occasions in the fifties.
"One O'Clock Jump" became the theme song of the Count Basie Orchestra. They used it to close each of their concerts for the next half century. It was reportedly titled "Blue Ball" at first but a radio announcer feared that title was too risqué.

Accolades
In 1979, the song was inducted into the Grammy Hall of Fame. Later, it was listed in the Songs of the Century.

Other Versions
"Two O'Clock Jump" was a performance by Harry James and his big band in 1939, slightly based on "One O'Clock Jump" but using triplets. Several versions of the original by Harry James and Benny Goodman feature the "Two O'Clock Jump" ending. Lionel Hampton used the song as his theme song for a while as well. Basie later released "Jumpin' at the Woodside" in a similar style.
A popular jazz standard for virtually all top swing bands and their fans and jitterbuggers, it was part of the concert bill for Benny Goodman's famous 1938 concert at Carnegie Hall. It was also the last number ever recorded by Earl Hines, in 1981 after a 58-year recording career.
Al Hirt released a version on his 1961 album He's the King and His Band.
Rush drummer Neil Peart included "One O'Clock Jump" in his drum solos on the band's concert tours in 2002 and 2004.

Appearance in film and television
The Tuskegee Airmen
The Grass Harp (1995 film version)
Harlem Nights
Enigma
The English Patient
Reveille with Beverly
Bon Voyage, Charlie Brown (and Don't Come Back!!)
The Gong Show

Web sources

See also
List of 1930s jazz standards

1937 songs
1930s jazz standards
Count Basie
Benny Goodman songs
Grammy Hall of Fame Award recipients
Jazz compositions
Swing jazz standards
Jazz compositions in F major
Jazz compositions in D-flat major
United States National Recording Registry recordings